"Perfect Strangers" is a song by British record producer Jonas Blue, featuring from JP Cooper, released through Capitol, Positiva, and Virgin EMI Records on 3 June 2016 as the second single from Blue's debut studio album Blue (2018). The song peaked at number two on the UK Singles Chart, and reached the top 10 positions in eight additional countries, including Germany, Australia, and Sweden. A Japanese version of the song by South Korean girl group AOA was released on their album Runway (2016).

The song was played at the inauguration of the 2019 UEFA Europa League Final between English teams Chelsea F.C. vs. Arsenal F.C.

Music video
A music video to accompany the release of "Perfect Strangers" was first released onto YouTube on 14 June 2016 at a total length of three minutes and twenty-seven seconds. The video is set and filmed in Cape Town in South Africa. It features a woman (Victoria Scholtz) always coincidentally meeting the same man (Devin Dollery) wherever she goes. They then ally together to help bring fun to the children in South Africa, with the man introducing them to skateboarding and the woman introducing them to breakdancing while falling in love in the process.

Track listing

Charts

Weekly charts

Year-end charts

Certifications

Release history

References

 

2016 songs
2016 singles
Jonas Blue songs
JP Cooper songs
Number-one singles in Poland
Songs written by Jonas Blue
Songs written by JP Cooper
Tropical house songs
Capitol Records singles
Positiva Records singles
Virgin EMI Records singles